The New York City St. Patrick's Day Parade is an annual parade organized by the Irish Community of New York City to honor Saint Patrick, the Patron Saint of Ireland while celebrating their Irish culture and heritage.

The parade is composed of thousands of participants from the many Irish cultural organizations and affiliated institutions across New York City, who each march under the banners of their respective groups.

The parade is led each year by a Grand Marshal, and features representation from across the uniformed services in New York City, which each have a significant affinity to the Irish community in New York.

These include the 69th New York Infantry Regiment, New York Police Department, Fire Department of the City of New York, New York Correction Department and New York State Department of Corrections.

The parade also features participants from across the city's political establishment, with the city's Mayors (Bill de Blasio) and City Councilors regularly marching in the parade.

The parade has also regularly attracted participants from national politics across both the United States (George J. Mitchell, Hillary Rodham Clinton) and Ireland (Leo Varadkar, Mary Lou McDonald).

For the first time in its history, the full parade was cancelled due to the Covid-19 pandemic, with no parades taking place during 2020 and 2021.  However, a small contingent consisting of representatives from the Fighting 69th Regiment and the parade committee still marched up Fifth Avenue in the early hours of March 17, 2020, in order to preserve the parade's 258-year record of marching.  In 2021, still in the throes of COVID, the parade again took a different shape, and only some 120 or so marchers, joined by NYC Mayor Bill de Blasio, made their way up Fifth Avenue.

The full parade returned to it's original format on March 17, 2022.

The most recent was on March 17, 2023.

Affiliated groups and other regular participants 

The following list of affiliated groups and participants was taken from the 2022 Line of March, which features the 145 groups marching in the 2022 parade.

Grand marshals 

A Grand Marshal of the parade is appointed each year, with the honored individual often a prominent Irish-American or someone who has contributed significantly to Irish-American affairs.

References

Further reading

Archival collections
 John Concannon and the Ancient Order of Hibernians Collection (The Monsignor Field Archives & Special Collection Center at Seton Hall University) - Contains a significant number of operational materials from parade leadership, primarily from the 1950s-1970s

Parades in New York City
Irish-American culture in New York City
Saint Patrick's Day